Jewels 2nd Ring, was a mixed martial arts (MMA) event, the second of women's MMA promotion Jewels.

Background
On , the event was first announced and a few days later the first bouts were announced, Hiroko Yamanaka vs. Michiko Takeda, Misaki Takimoto vs. Yasuko Tamada, Masako Yoshida vs. Shinsaki Ozawa and Shizuka Sugiyama vs. Shiho Shiho, along with the participation of Saori Ishioka and Mayumi Aoki. On , debutants Hanako Kobayashi and Chihiro Oikawa were added to the card. The card had a rematch between Hiroko Yamanaka and Michiko Takeda, who had previously fought in Smackgirl in 2007, with Yamanaka winning the bout by split decision.

Results

See also
 Jewels (mixed martial arts)
 2009 in Jewels

References

External links
Official results at Jewels 
Event results at Sherdog
Event results at Fightergirls.com
Event results  at Bout Review 
Event results at God Bless the Ring 
Event results at kakutoh.com 
Event results at sportsnavi.com 

Jewels (mixed martial arts) events
2009 in mixed martial arts
Mixed martial arts in Japan
Sports competitions in Tokyo
2009 in Japanese sport